Spencertown is a hamlet in the town of Austerlitz, Columbia County, New York, United States. Its ZIP code is 12165.

The Daniel and Clarissa Baldwin House, Pratt Homestead, Spencertown Academy, and St. Peter's Presbyterian Church and Spencertown Cemetery are listed on the National Register of Historic Places.

Gallery

Notes

Hamlets in Columbia County, New York
Hamlets in New York (state)